Braubach is a small river of Hesse, Germany. It is a right tributary of the Liederbach near Kelkheim.

See also

List of rivers of Hesse

Rivers of Hesse
Rivers of the Taunus
Rivers of Germany